Björn Phau (born 4 October 1979) is a retired German tennis player. He achieved a career-high singles ranking of World No. 59 in June 2006. Career highlights include reaching five ATP tour semifinals (Tokyo in 2005, Casablanca in 2006, Beijing in 2008, Houston in 2009 and Zagreb in 2014) and finishing runner-up in doubles at Munich in 2006 (partnering Alexander Peya).

Phau defeated Andre Agassi 7–5, 7–5 at the 2006 Dubai Tennis Championships. In an interview, Agassi cited Phau as one of the quickest tennis players he has ever faced. His main strengths are his movement, foot speed and fitness. He is sponsored by Nike and Wilson.

Personal life
Phau was born in Darmstadt. He is the son of a German mother and an Indonesian father.

ATP career finals

Doubles: 1 (0–1)

Challenger & Futures singles titles

Doubles finals (1)

Performance timelines

Singles

Doubles
''Current through the 2012 US Open (tennis).

References

External links
 
 
  

1979 births
Living people
Sportspeople from Darmstadt
German male tennis players
German people of Indonesian descent
Tennis people from Hesse